was a village located in Inba District, Chiba Prefecture, Japan.

Inba Village was created on March 10, 1955 through the merger of Rokugo and Munakata Villages. The development of Chiba New Town greatly accelerated the development of the village, which became a bedroom community for Chiba.

As of February 2011, the village had an estimated population of 13,731 and a population density of 295 persons per km². The total area was 46.57 km².

On March 23, 2010, Inba, along with the village of Motono (also from Inba District), was merged into the expanded city of Inzai.

External links
 Inzai official website 

Dissolved municipalities of Chiba Prefecture
Inzai